JLIS.it: Italian Journal of Library, Archives and Information Science is a triannual peer-reviewed academic journal covering research in library, archival, and information science. It was established in 2010 and is published by the eum edizioni università di macerata. The editor-in-chief is Mauro Guerrini (University of Florence).

Abstracting and indexing
The journal is abstracted and indexed in:

References

External links
 

Library and information science journals
Archival science journals
Publications established in 2010
Triannual journals
Multilingual journals
Academic journals published by university presses
University of Florence